Leo James Corbett (25 June 1895 – 19 September 1959) was an Australian rules footballer who played with St Kilda in the Victorian Football League (VFL).

Notes

External links 

1895 births
1959 deaths
Australian rules footballers from Victoria (Australia)
St Kilda Football Club players
Sandringham Football Club players
Australian military personnel of World War I